The Federal Correctional Institution, Dublin (FCI Dublin) is a low-security United States  federal prison for female inmates in Dublin, California. The facility also has an adjacent satellite prison camp housing minimum-security female offenders.

FCI Dublin is located 20 miles southeast of Oakland on the Parks Reserve Forces Training Area. It is located near Santa Rita Jail, which is operated by Alameda County.

In 2021 and 2022, the facility was embroiled in a scandal over a permissive and toxic culture of rampant sexual abuse by staff at the facility.

History
FCI Dublin opened in 1974. It became an exclusively female prison in 2012 and is one of five federal prisons for women in the United States.

Facility and programs

The prison's education department offers GED and ESL programs, as well as courses in parenting skills. The prison also provides legal and leisure library services in addition to training in the use of various computer software.

There are two Federal Prison Industries UNICOR programs at FCI Dublin: the Textiles and the Call Center. Textiles employ approximately 150 inmates on the manufacture of custom draperies, parachutes, and disaster blankets. They also sort and repair USPS mailbags. The Call Center employs around 250 inmates on directory assistance inquiries.

It houses inmates who are serving an average sentence of 5 years. It has a design capacity of 250 inmates, but houses 1,077 as of April 11, 2013. Conditions are cramped, with three inmates sharing a cell on the top tier and four inmates sharing a cell on the bottom tier, designed to house a single prisoner. Meals are served in shifts due to the small size of the dining facilities.

Like most American prisons, FCI Dublin also contains a SHU (Security Housing Unit), where any prisoners who are deemed to have broken prison rules are kept in segregation under a highly restrictive regime. Prisoners in the SHU spend more time locked in their cell than the general prison population, are only allowed out for limited amounts of time and must be transported to and from their cell wearing handcuffs. Depending on the circumstances, an inmate may spend weeks or even months in the SHU.

The institution also has an adjacent administrative detention facility housing adult males on holdover or pre-trial status, and a minimum-security satellite camp housing adult female offenders, which opened in 1990. This minimum-security camp was several old army barracks and these have been torn down. The BOP has removed a section of the FCI and placed approximately 200 female minimum security prisoners in this space. This facility is just short of a FCI. All the guards are rotated out of the FCI.

Notable incidents
On November 5, 1986, Ronald McIntosh, who had escaped during a prison transfer one month earlier, landed a stolen helicopter in the exercise yard and escaped with Samantha Lopez, who was serving a 50-year sentence for bank robbery. Mr. McIntosh was serving a sentence for wire fraud when he met Ms. Lopez working in the business office of the prison and the two devised the escape plan. They were arrested by FBI Agents 10 days later and subsequently convicted of air piracy and escape. McIntosh received a 25-year sentence and Lopez had five years added to her sentence.

Sexual abuse of prisoners
A 2022 investigation by the Associated Press reported a "permissive and toxic culture...of sexual misconduct by predatory employees". The AP reported that inmates alleged "rampant sexual abuse by correctional officers", and that prisoner were allegedly "threatened or punished when they tried to speak up".

In 2022, the prison chaplain signed a plea agreement and was scheduled to plead guilty to sexually abusing one inmate, and former warden Ray J. Garcia was found guilty of sexual offenses against prisoners.

Notable inmates
†Inmates incarcerated prior to 1982 do not have an assigned register number.

See also
 Federal Bureau of Prisons facilities in California
 List of U.S. federal prisons
 Federal Bureau of Prisons
 Incarceration in the United States

References

External links
 FCI Dublin - Official BOP Website

Buildings and structures in Alameda County, California
Dublin, California
Dublin
Dublin
1974 establishments in California